Glass Museum may refer to:

 Broadfield House Glass Museum, West Midlands, England
Corning Museum of Glass, Corning, New York
 Glass Museum of Hsinchu City, Hsinchu City, Taiwan
 Imperial Glass Museum, Bellaire, Ohio, USA
 Murano Glass Museum, Venice, Italy
Museum of Glass, Tacoma, Washington
 National Heisey Glass Museum, Newark, Ohio, USA
 Ohio Glass Museum, Lancaster, Ohio, USA

See also 
 Museum of Glass (disambiguation)